Bonby is a village and civil parish in North Lincolnshire, England, and approximately  south from Barton-upon-Humber. According to the 2001 Census it had a population of 481, increasing to 532 at the 2011 census.

The village was recorded in the Domesday Book under the name of "Bundebi".

The Grade II listed Anglican parish church is dedicated to St Andrew. The church has an Early English nave and chancel, and a 17th-century brick tower. Bonby held a small priory, established by the Benedictine priory of St Fromund in Normandy. The priory was transferred to the Carthusian order at Beauvale, Nottinghamshire.

Gallery

References

External links

Villages in the Borough of North Lincolnshire
Civil parishes in Lincolnshire